The Lord's Prayer is a central prayer in Christianity.

Lord's Prayer may also refer to:
 "The Lord's Prayer" (Albert Hay Malotte song), 1935
 The Lord's Prayer (Mormon Tabernacle Choir album), 1959
 "The Lord's Prayer", a 1972 song written and recorded by Roy Harper on the album Lifemask
 "The Lord's Prayer" (David Fanshawe song), 1988
 "The Lord's Prayer" (Sister Janet Mead song), 1973
 "The Lord's Prayer", a song by Siouxsie and the Banshees, based on highlights of the jam performed by the band at their debut concert in 1976

See also
 Pray to God (disambiguation)